Events in the year 1834 in Brazil.

Incumbents
 Monarch – Pedro II

Events

Births

Deaths

References

 
1830s in Brazil
Years of the 19th century in Brazil
Brazil
Brazil